Göksu Üçtaş Şanlı (born August 30, 1990, in Şahinbey, Gaziantep Province, Turkey) is a Turkish female artistic gymnast.  She was the first Turkish female artistic gymnast to compete at the Olympic Games, doing so at the 2012 Olympic Games in London.

Personal life 
Üçtaş was born in Şahinbey in 1990.  She took up gymnastics when she was five years old.  In 2008 she began studies at Bolu Abant Izzet Baysal University, studying Physical Education and Sports.  Üçtaş married fellow gymnast Özgür Şanlı in 2013.  They welcomed their first child, a daughter named Lina, in 2015.

Career

2006–2008
Üçtas became age-eligible for senior competition in 2006.  She competed at the 2006 World Championships.  In doing so she became the first female gymnast to represent Turkey at the World Championships.

Üçtas was meant to compete at the 2008 Summer Olympics but failed to do so due to a severe neck injury which could have stopped her gymnastics career.

2009–2010 
Üçtas competed at the 2009 Mediterranean Games held in Pescara, Italy.  She placed seventh in the all-around and won silver on vault behind Youna Dufournet.  She later competed at the 2009 World Championships where she placed 38th in the all-around during qualifications.

In 2010, Üçtaş won the bronze medal on floor exercise at the Doha World Cup.  At the Ostrava World Cup she won gold on floor exercise and silver on vault and balance beam.

2011–2012
Üçtas graduated as a teacher of physical education and sports from the Abant Izzet Baysal University in Bolu Province in 2011.

Üçtaş competed at the Olympic Test Event where she qualified to compete in the 2012 Olympic Games.  In doing so she became the first-ever Olympic female gymnast from Turkey. Due to an injury suffered during training prior to the Olympics, she only competed on balance beam. With a score of 11.333, Üçtaş ranked 77th on the apparatus and did not advance to the final.

2013–2015
In early 2013 Üçtaş announced her retirement from gymnastics due to a long-lasting injury on her left elbow. On August 14, 2013, she married gymnast Özgün Şanlı in İzmir.  Üçtaş Şanlı gave birth to their daughter in 2015.

2016–2017
Eleven months after giving birth Üçtaş Şanlı returned to competition at the Mersin Challenge Cup.  She won the gold medal on floor exercise.

At the 2017 Baku World Cup, Üçtaş Şanlı finished seventh on balance beam and fifth on floor exercise.  At the Doha World Cup she finished sixth on balance beam and fifth on floor exercise.  In May Üçtaş Şanlı competed at the Islamic Solidarity Games where she helped Turkey finish second as a team.  Individually she placed ninth in the all-around but won gold on balance beam and silver on floor exercise.

2018–2020 
At the Baku World Cup Üçtaş Şanlı finished eighth on vault, sixth on balance beam, and sixth on floor exercise.  At the Koper Challenge Cup she finished fifth on balance beam.  At the Mersin Challenge Cup she won bronze on vault and gold on balance beam and floor exercise.  At the 2018 Mediterranean Games Üçtaş Şanlı won silver on floor exercise.

At the 2019 Koper Challenge Cup Üçtaş Şanlı finished sixth on balance beam and seventh on floor exercise.  she next competed at the Mersin Challenge Cup where she won gold on floor exercise.

At the 2020 European Championships Üçtaş Şanlı won the silver medal on floor exercise, which was the first-ever medal for Turkey at the event.

2021–2022
Üçtaş Şanlı competed at the European Championships where she placed 34th in the all-around during qualification.  She competed at various World Cups before competing at the World Championships where she finished 42nd during qualifications.  She competed at the Arthur Gander Memorial where she finished fifth in the three-event all-around.  Üçtaş Şanlı ended the season competing at the Swiss Cup, a unique mixed-pairs event.  She was partnered with Ahmet Önder; they finished fifth.

Üçtaş Şanlı competed at the 2022 Osijek Challenge Cup where she won bronze on floor exercise.  She next competed at the 2022 Mediterranean Games where she helped Turkey finish fourth as a team.  Individually Üçtaş Şanlı finished fourth on floor exercise.  At the European Championships she helped Turkey finish 20th as a team; she did not qualify for any event finals.

Competitive history

References

External links
 
 

1990 births
Living people
Turkish female artistic gymnasts
Gymnasts at the 2012 Summer Olympics
Olympic gymnasts of Turkey
Competitors at the 2009 Mediterranean Games
Competitors at the 2018 Mediterranean Games
Mediterranean Games medalists in gymnastics
Mediterranean Games silver medalists for Turkey
Bolu Abant Izzet Baysal University alumni
Sportspeople from Gaziantep
Islamic Solidarity Games competitors for Turkey
Gymnasts at the 2022 Mediterranean Games
21st-century Turkish women